The West Virginia Capitol Complex is an  historic district located along Kanawha Blvd., E., in Charleston, West Virginia.  It dates from 1925 and was listed on the National Register of Historic Places in 1974.

It includes the three part capitol buildings, the West Virginia State Capitol, designed and supervised by architect Cass Gilbert.  And it includes the Governor's residence, West Virginia Executive Mansion, designed by Charleston architect Walter F. Martens.

It includes Colonial Revival architecture and Italian Renaissance architecture.

It includes two contributing buildings, one the capitol building and one a residence.

References

External links

Government buildings on the National Register of Historic Places in West Virginia
Historic districts on the National Register of Historic Places in West Virginia
Colonial Revival architecture in West Virginia
Buildings and structures in Charleston, West Virginia
Historic American Buildings Survey in West Virginia
National Register of Historic Places in Charleston, West Virginia